Gerster is a surname. Notable people with the surname include:

Andreas Gerster (born 1982), international footballer from Liechtenstein
Béla Gerster (1850–1923), Hungarian engineer and canal architect
Etelka Gerster (1855–1920), Hungarian soprano
Georg Gerster (1928–2019), Swiss journalist and a pioneer aerial photographer
Frank Gerster (born 1976), former German footballer
Jan-Ole Gerster (born 1978), German film director
Martin Gerster (born 1971), German politician
Petra Gerster (born 1955), German journalist
Robin Gerster, Australian author and academic

See also 
Gustav Gerster, family-owned textiles company based in Biberach an der Riß, Germany
Gerster, Missouri, village in St. Clair County, Missouri, United States

German-language surnames